The World Para Ice Hockey European Championships (formerly IPC Ice Sledge Hockey European Championships) is the European ice sledge hockey championships. The European Championship is also a qualifying tournament for the IPC Ice Sledge Hockey World Championships and the Paralympic Games.

The first European Championship was held in 2005.

Summaries

Participation details

See also
World Para Ice Hockey Championships
Ice Hockey European Championships

References

   
European
Recurring sporting events established in 2005
Ice hockey competitions in Europe